The Military ranks of the Netherlands armed forces are the military insignia used by the armed forces of the Netherlands.

Commander-in-Chief
In 2013, the King of the Netherlands was given special insignia as part of his role as Commander-in-Chief.

Royal Netherlands Army

Current ranks
Officer ranks

Enlisted ranks

The Dutch titles for privates are:

Timeline of ranks
Officer ranks

Enlisted ranks

Royal Netherlands Air Force

Current ranks
Officer ranks

Enlisted ranks

Timeline of ranks

Royal Netherlands Navy

Current ranks
Officer ranks

Enlisted ranks

Timeline of changes

Royal Marechaussee

Current ranks
Officer ranks

Enlisted ranks

Timeline of ranks
Officer ranks

Enlisted ranks

Cadet ranks at the Royal Military Academy and Royal Naval College

Overseas forces
Officer ranks

Enlisted ranks

Former ranks

  (Field) Marshal), OF-10 of the Royal Netherlands Army, abolished in 1914.
Jacques Willem van Asdonck (Rangkasbitung, West Java, 1914) was the last  to leave active service in 1969.

References

External links
 Aanbieding van het gedenkboek van de T-Brigade "Tussen sawahs en bergen" door de commandant van de Brigade, kolonel D.R.A. van Langen, aan de commandant B-Divisie, generaal-majoor J.K. Meyer.
 Onderofficieren van de Kader School Infanterie, gevestigd op de Isabella kazerne in Den Bosch (Vught), kijken naar een sportwedstrijd.
 Sergeant der Luchtvaartafdeeling (LVA) Hansen.
 Genisten (officieren, onderofficieren en minderen) in de houding op een voltooide schipbrug.

Military ranks of the Netherlands
Netherlands